The traditional districts of Denmark differ from the country's administrative country subdivisions nowadays, as their existence and extent are usually not defined by law. The Danes will often refer to their traditional districts if asked where they come from, rather than the administrative unit which have been changed several times (last in 2007).

Some of these districts are nationally known, others more locally. Some of them may vary in their delimitations, while others are based on ancient hundreds and syssels with fixed borders. Dialect, folklore and local identity will or would often vary from one traditional district to another.

The lands of Denmark were the three major parts of the country until the 17th century.

Scanian Provinces
Scania (now Swedish)
Halland (now Swedish)
Blekinge (now Swedish)
Bornholm
Øerne ('The Islands')
Zealand
Hornsherred
Odsherred
North Zealand
Stevns
Møn
Lolland-Falster or Smålandene
Lolland
Falster
Funen
South Funen Archipelago
Langeland
Tåsinge
Ærø
Jutland
South Jutland
Vestslesvig
Als
Sundeved
Tørninglen
Angel (now German)
Svans (now German)
North Frisia (now German)
East Jutland
Kronjylland
Djursland
Bjerreherred
West Jutland
Hardsyssel
Fjends
Northwest Jutland
Thy
Mors
Salling
North Jutland
Himmerland
Hanherred
Vendsyssel

See also
Districts of Norway
Provinces of Sweden
Subdivisions of the Nordic countries
Administrative divisions of Denmark

 
Vernacular geography
Former subdivisions of Denmark
Former states and territories of Denmark